The Beacon Hill-Alta Vista Residential District is a U.S. historic district (designated as such on March 4, 1993) located in Lakeland, Florida. The district is bounded by South Florida Avenue, West Beacon Road, West Belvedere Street and Cherokee Trail. It contains 77 historic buildings.

References

External links
 Polk County listings at National Register of Historic Places

Lakeland, Florida
National Register of Historic Places in Polk County, Florida
Historic districts on the National Register of Historic Places in Florida
Vernacular architecture in Florida